Ashraf Eid Taysir Bait Taysir (born 29 September 1982), commonly known as Ashraf Taysir, is an Omani footballer who last played for Dhofar S.C.S.C. in the Oman Elite League.

Club career statistics

International career
Ashraf was selected for the national team for the first time in 2005. He has made appearances in the 2010 FIFA World Cup qualification and has represented national team in the 2007 AFC Asian Cup qualification.

References

External links
 
 
 
 

1982 births
Living people
Omani footballers
Oman international footballers
Association football defenders
Al-Nasr SC (Salalah) players
Dhofar Club players
Qatar Stars League players
Al Kharaitiyat SC players
Expatriate footballers in Qatar
Omani expatriate sportspeople in Qatar